Lisa Raymond and Samantha Stosur were the defending champions, but Stosur chose not to participate, and only Raymond competed that year.
Raymond partnered with Maria Kirilenko, but lost in the first round to Daniela Hantuchová and Ai Sugiyama.

Dinara Safina and Elena Vesnina won in the final 6–1, 1–6, 10–8 against Yan Zi and Zheng Jie.

Seeds

Draw

Finals

Top half

Bottom half

External links
Draw

2008 Pacific Life Open
Pacific Life Open